Shantanu Mukherjee (born 30 September 1972), popularly known as Shaan, is an Indian playback singer, composer, actor and television host. He has recorded numerous songs for films and albums in various Indian languages. Shaan hosted the shows Sa Re Ga Ma Pa, Sa Re Ga Ma Pa L'il Champs, Star Voice of India and STAR Voice of India 2. He appeared as a judge in Sa Re Ga Ma Pa L'il Champs 2014–2015 and The Voice India Kids 2016-2017.

Personal life

Shaan was born on 30 September 1972 in Mumbai in a Bengali family. His grandfather was Jahar Mukherjee, a well known lyricist, his father late Manas Mukherjee, was a music director and his sister Sagarika is a singer as well. He grew up in Mumbai, Maharashtra.

Early years in musical career
Shaan began his career singing jingles for advertisements. Along with jingles, began to sing remixes and cover versions.

Shaan and his sister signed up with Magnasound recording company and recorded a few successful albums, including the hit album Naujawan followed by Q-Funk. Later, Shaan launched Love-Ology after this. In 2000, he sang a superhit song "Tanha Dil Tanha Safar" from his album Tanha Dil.

In 2002, he won the MTV Asia Award for Favorite Artist India for best solo album for his album Tanha Dil. One year later, Shaan launched his album Aksar, which was successful and contained songs featuring international stars such as Blue, Melanie C and Samira Said. For both the albums Tanha Dil and Aksar, Shaan sang, composed and wrote the lyrics of all the songs, except the title track "Tanha Dil", which was composed by Ram Sampath.

He released Tomar Aakash in 2004, a Bengali album, along with his sister and featuring his father's unreleased songs. In 2006, he released a song with MLTR, "Take me to your heart". The song appears on his album Tishnagi, which is produced by Ranjit Barot and engineered by Ashish Manchanda.

Career in playback singing
Shaan made his playback singing debut in 1999 in the movie Pyaar Mein Kabhi Kabhi where he sung two songs in the film. The song "Musu Musu Hasi" instantly struck a chord among the viewers and was very relatable to the youth.He has recently recorded a playback for an upcoming Bengali feature film Network which is composed by Dabbu.

Working as host and judge
Shaan hosted the television show Sa Re Ga Ma Pa on Zee TV between the years 2000–2006.

Shaan has been a judge on many talent shows. Shaan is a team captain, judge and mentor on STAR Plus's Music Ka Maha  Muqqabla for the team Shaan's Strikers. Shaan appeared as a judge in Sa Re Ga Ma Pa L'il Champs 2014–2015 and The Voice India Kids 2016. In 2015 and 2016, Shaan was the winning coach in each of the first two seasons of The Voice.

Discography

Filmography

Films
Along with singing, Shaan has acted in the movie Daman: A Victim of Marital Violence, also starring Raveena Tandon. His songs have appeared in the movies, Zameen and Hungama.

Television

 Advisor 
Currently, he is a member of the Board of Advisors of India's International Movement to Unite Nations (I.I.M.U.N.).

Awards
Shaan's song "Chand Sifarish" (from the movie Fanaa) and "Jab Se Tere Naina" (from Saawariya) won the Filmfare Best Male Playback Award and the Zee Cine Award Best Playback Singer - Male, in addition to receiving several other nominations. In 2002, he won the MTV Asia Music Award for best solo album for his album Tanha Dil.'' Following are the list of awards and nominations in different categories.

See also
 List of Indian playback singers

References

External links

 

1972 births
Assamese playback singers
Assamese-language singers
Bengali Hindus
Bengali singers
Indian male singer-songwriters
Indian male playback singers
Indian male pop singers
Bollywood playback singers
Bengali playback singers
Hindi-language singers
Kannada playback singers
Konkani-language singers
Odia playback singers
Living people
People from Madhya Pradesh
Performers of Hindu music
Sa Re Ga Ma Pa participants
Filmfare Awards winners
Screen Awards winners
Zee Cine Awards winners
International Indian Film Academy Awards winners
Indian folk-pop singers
21st-century Indian male singers
21st-century Indian singers
Singers from Mumbai
21st-century Indian male classical singers